Odwulf of Evesham (or Odulf, Odulph, Odulfo, Odulphus; died 855) was a ninth century saint, monk and Frisian missionary.

Lives

Odwulf is recorded in the Medieval Secgan Hagiography the Medieval Hagiography of Saint Ecgwine and the Ave presul glorioseI Augustine psalter, where he is linked with Oda of Canterbury, hagiography of St Odulf, and Chronicon Abbatiae de Evesham

Odwuld died in 855 AD.
He is buried in Evesham, with Saints Ecgwine and Wigstan.

Monks of Ramsgate account

The monks of St Augustine's Abbey, Ramsgate wrote in their Book of Saints (1921),

Butler's account

The hagiographer Alban Butler (1710–1773) wrote in his Lives of the Fathers, Martyrs, and Other Principal Saints under July 18,

Notes

References

Sources

 

 

Medieval English saints
9th-century Christian saints
Year of birth unknown
Roman Catholic monks
English Christian monks
Burials at Evesham Abbey
855 deaths